Cholmley is a surname. Notable people with the surname include:

Ralph Cholmley, MP
Henry Cholmley
Henry Cholmley (died 1616), MP
Richard Cholmley
Sir George Strickland, 7th Baronet, also known as George Cholmley

See also
Cholmondeley (disambiguation)
Cholmeley (disambiguation)